The fifty dollar bill may refer to banknotes (bills) of currencies that are named dollar. Note that some of these currencies may have coins for 50 dollars instead.

 Fifty dollar note (Australian)
 Canadian fifty-dollar bill
 United States fifty-dollar bill